Joseph Friedrich Hummel (14 August 1841 in Innsbruck – 29 August 1919 in Salzburg) was an Austrian choral conductor, composer and music teacher. Father of musicologist Walter Hummel, he was a musician and promoter of the works of Wagner, Bruckner and Strauss, a representative of the more creative sounding musical culture of his time. The Josef-Friedrich-Hummel-Straße, a street in Salzburg located in close proximity to the main building of the Mozarteum, was named after him.

Biography
Joseph Hummel studied music at the Hochschule für Musik und Theater München under Franz Lachner and worked as theater kapellmeister in Innsbruck, Aachen, Troppau and Vienna, as well as conductor of the Brünn City Theatre from 1876-1879. He became director of the Mozarteum Orchestra and head of the newly established music school International Mozarteum Foundation from 1880-1908. There, he played with the orchestra that he founded, the women's choir and led the Salzburger Liedertafel (amateur male choir) from 1882-1912, organizing several major choral festivals in Salzburg, and thus gaining the reputation as a fine Mozart conductor.

Works
Hummel was the author of the opera Der Vampyr (1862), two concertos for clarinet and orchestra, choral and chamber music.

Clarinet Concerto No. 1 in E-flat major, Op. posth. (1975) 
Clarinet Concerto No. 2 in F-moll minor, Op. posth. (1976)
Mandolinata for string sextet, Op. 61 (1910)
Concertante Piece in B-flat major, Op. 201 
Trio in B-flat (1885)
Trio in B-moll major
Trio in B-moll minor
Mass in F minor
Mass in E-flat minor
Pastoral Mass
Herz-Jesu Lieder

References

External links

1841 births
1919 deaths
19th-century classical composers
20th-century classical composers
Austrian classical musicians
Male conductors (music)
Austrian Romantic composers
Austrian male classical composers
20th-century Austrian conductors (music)
20th-century Austrian male musicians
19th-century male musicians